An androgen or anabolic steroid ester is an ester of an androgen/anabolic steroid (AAS) such as the natural testosterone or dihydrotestosterone (DHT) or the synthetic nandrolone (19-nortestosterone). Esterification renders AAS into metabolism-resistant prohormones of themselves, improving oral bioavailability, increasing lipophilicity, and extending the elimination half-life (which necessitates less frequent administration). In addition, with intramuscular injection, AAS esters are absorbed more slowly into the body, further improving the elimination half-life. Aside from differences in pharmacokinetics (e.g., duration), these esters essentially have the same effects as the parent drugs. They are used in androgen replacement therapy (ART), among other indications. Examples of androgen esters include testosterone esters such as testosterone cypionate, testosterone enanthate, testosterone propionate, and testosterone undecanoate and nandrolone esters such as nandrolone decanoate and nandrolone phenylpropionate.

See also
 List of androgen esters
 List of androgens/anabolic steroids
 Steroid ester
 Estrogen ester
 Progestogen ester

References

Further reading
 

Androgen esters
Androgens and anabolic steroids
Androstanes
Prodrugs